National Sports Centre is a purpose-built stadium in Kamëz, Tiranë, Albania.

References 

Football venues in Albania
Buildings and structures in Kamëz
Association football training grounds in Albania
National football academies